White Rock Creek is a river in Republic, Smith, and Jewell counties in the U.S. State of Kansas. White Rock Creek flows into the Republican River.

References

Rivers of Kansas
Rivers of Jewell County, Kansas